The Trans-European Seaport network is one of a number of the Trans-European Transport Networks (TEN-T) of the European Union.

According to Article 12 of the Decision No 1692/96/EC of the European Parliament and of the Council of 23 July 1996 on Community guidelines for the development of the trans-European transport network, the Trans-European Seaport network should permit the development of sea transport, and should constitute shipping links for islands and the points of interconnection between sea transport and other modes of transport. They should also provide equipment and services to transport operators. Their infrastructure should provide a range of services for passenger and freight transport, including ferry services and short- and long-distance shipping services, which also includes coastal shipping, within the Community and between the latter and non-member countries.

The seaports included in the Trans-European Transport network must correspond to one of the following three categories:
 
A. International seaports: Ports with a total annual traffic volume of not less than 1.5 million tonnes of freight, or 200,000 passengers.  These ports are connected with the overland elements of the Trans-European Transport network, unless that is physically impossible, and therefore play a major role in international maritime transport. Seaports in category A are shown  on this map (13 MB), p. 93

B. Community seaports: These ports have a total annual traffic volume of not less than 0.5 million tonnes of freight or between 100,000 and 199,999 passengers, and are connected with the overland elements of the Trans-European Transport network, unless that is physically impossible, and are equipped with the necessary transhipment facilities for short-distance sea shipping.

C. Regional ports: These ports do not meet the criteria of categories A and B but are situated in island, peripheral or outermost regions, interconnecting such regions by sea and/or connecting them with the central regions of the Community.

Core ports 
List of core TEN-T ports as identified in a 2010 report financed by the Directorate-General for Mobility and Transport. Note that the list features port of non-EU member states such as Iceland, Norway and Turkey. Also, since 2020, the United Kingdom no longer forms part of the European Union.

References

Trans-European Transport Network
Water transport in Europe